Kokra is a settlement scattered along a  stretch of the road from Kranj to Jezersko Peak in the Kokra Valley in the Municipality of Preddvor in the Upper Carniola region of Slovenia.

Church

The parish church in the settlement is dedicated to the Immaculate Conception. It was completed in 1797 and dedicated in 1802.

Other cultural heritage
There is also a monument to the local victims of the Second World War in the settlement.

References

External links
Kokra at Geopedia.si

Populated places in the Municipality of Preddvor